The Trial of Mary Dugan is a 1941 American drama and thriller film directed by Norman Z. McLeod, written by Bayard Veiller from his 1927 play of the same name. It had previously been made as a 1929 MGM movie starring Norma Shearer in her first all-talking role. There are significant differences in the two movie versions.

The 1941 remake starred Laraine Day, Robert Young, Tom Conway, Frieda Inescort, John Litel, Marsha Hunt, Marjorie Main and Henry O'Neill. It was released on February 14, 1941, by Metro-Goldwyn-Mayer.

Plot
Released from a reformatory after two years there for stealing $500, Mary Dugan is advised by a friend there, Agatha Hall, to change her name. Mary decides to go by Mary Andrews and her friend Aggie becomes a showgirl, now called Irene.

Mary's father is hit by a car and killed. The car's owner, wealthy businessman Edgar Wayne, offers her a job. She eventually becomes his private secretary. She also meets the company's attorney, Jimmy Blake, and falls in love. But when Jimmy gets a job in South America, she can't marry him and go along because a birth certificate, required for a passport, would reveal Mary's true identity.

A year later, Jimmy returns because Wayne has been murdered and Mary charged with the crime. He dislikes the way attorney West is handling her case and volunteers to replace him. Wayne's widow testifies that Mary and her husband were having an affair. Jimmy proves that West and the widow schemed to kill her husband, who was leaving her, and make Mary the scapegoat. She is found not guilty.

Cast 
Laraine Day as Mary Dugan
Robert Young as Jimmy Blake
Tom Conway as Edgar Wayne
Frieda Inescort as Mrs. Wayne
John Litel as Mr. West
Marsha Hunt as Agatha Hall
Marjorie Main as Mrs. Collins
Henry O'Neill as Galway
Sara Haden as Miss Matthews
Nora Perry as Sally
Alma Kruger as Dr. Saunders
Pierre Watkin as Judge Nash
Addison Richards as Capt. Price
Francis Pierlot as John Masters

References

External links 
 

1941 films
Metro-Goldwyn-Mayer films
Films directed by Norman Z. McLeod
1940s thriller drama films
American thriller drama films
American black-and-white films
1941 drama films
1940s English-language films
1940s American films